A fountain square is a park or plaza in a city that features a fountain. It may stand alone or as part of a larger public park.

In the United States, there are numerous fountain squares, many of which are actually called "fountain square."  There are fountain squares in places such as Indianapolis, Indiana; Evanston, Illinois; and Bowling Green, Kentucky.  The Fountain Square in Cincinnati, Ohio has continued to be a popular tourist attraction for more than 100 years; its famous Tyler Davidson Fountain is shown in the opening credits of the TV series WKRP in Cincinnati. 

Fountains Square in Baku, Azerbaijan, is one of the country's most famous tourist destinations.

Town squares
Fountains